Prgomet is a municipality in Croatia in the Split-Dalmatia County. It has a population of 673 (2011 census), absolute majority of which are Croats.

References

Municipalities of Croatia
Populated places in Split-Dalmatia County